Kerriidae is a family of scale insects, commonly known as lac insects or lac scales. Some members of the genera Metatachardia, Tachardiella, Austrotacharidia, Afrotachardina, Tachardina, and Kerria are raised for commercial purposes, though the most commonly cultivated species is Kerria lacca. These insects secrete a waxy resin that is harvested and converted commercially into lac and shellac, used in various dyes, cosmetics, food glazes, wood finishing varnishes and polishes.

Species include:
Kerria lacca – true lac scale
Paratachardina decorella – rosette lac scale
Paratachardina pseudolobata – lobate lac scale

See also
 Shellac
 Lac

References

External links

Taxonomy

 
Scale insects
Hemiptera families
Neococcoids